The 1891 Chilean presidential election may refer to:
July 1891 Chilean presidential election
October 1891 Chilean presidential election